Una Mae Carlisle (December 26, 1915 – November 7, 1956) was an American jazz singer, pianist, and songwriter.

Early life
Carlisle was born in Zanesville, Ohio, the daughter of Edward and Mellie Carlisle. She was of African and Native American descent. Trained to play piano by her mother, she was performing in public by age three.

Career
Still a child, she performed regularly on radio station WHIO (AM) in Dayton, Ohio.

In 1932, while she was still in her teens, Fats Waller discovered Carlisle while she worked as a local Cincinnati, Ohio, performer live and on radio. Her piano style was very much influenced by Waller's; she played in a boogie-woogie/stride style and incorporated humor into her sets.

She played solo from 1937, touring Europe repeatedly and recording with Waller late in the 1930s.

In the 1940s, Carlisle recorded as a leader for Bluebird Records, with sidemen such as Lester Young, Benny Carter, and John Kirby. She had a longtime partnership with producer/publisher/manager Joe Davis, which began after her contract with Bluebird expired. Her records under Davis included performances from Ray Nance, Budd Johnson, and Shadow Wilson.

She also saw success as a songwriter. Her 1941 song "Walkin' By The River" made her "the first black woman to have a composition appear on a Billboard chart". Cab Calloway and Peggy Lee were among those who covered her tunes. She had her own radio show, The Una Mae Carlisle Radio Show on WJZ-ABC, making her the "first black American to host a national radio show"; and television programs late in the 1940s. Her last recordings were for Columbia Records with Don Redman early in the 1950s.

Personal life
Carlisle was married to John Bradford, a former merchant seaman. They married in 1941. Bradford was the owner of Gee-Haw Stables, a jazz venue in Harlem.

Carlisle suffered from chronic mastoiditis, requiring repeated surgeries and hospitalizations, which forced her to retire in 1952.

She died of pneumonia in a Harlem hospital in 1956. She is buried in Old Silvercreek Cemetery in Jamestown, Ohio.

Partial discography
 "Tain't Yours" b/w "Without You Baby" (Beacon, 1944)

References

External links
[ Una Mae Carlisle] at Allmusic
Una Mae Carlisle at Discogs

1915 births
1956 deaths
American jazz pianists
American women jazz singers
American jazz singers
Songwriters from Ohio
20th-century American women pianists
20th-century American pianists
Deaths from pneumonia in New York City
20th-century American women singers
Jazz musicians from Ohio
20th-century American singers
Bluebird Records artists